General Gregory may refer to:

Andrew Gregory (born 1957), British Army lieutenant general
Charles Levinge Gregory (1870–1944), British Indian Army major general
Edmund B. Gregory (1882–1961), U.S. Army lieutenant general
Isaac Gregory (c. 1737–1800), North Carolina Militia brigadier general in the American Revolutionary War
Jack I. Gregory (born 1931), U.S. Air Force general
Maurice C. Gregory (1881–1949), U.S. Marine Corps brigadier general
Sandra A. Gregory (fl. 1970s–2000s), U.S. Air Force brigadier general

See also
Matthew Gregory (attorney) (born 1968),  Attorney General of the Northern Mariana Islands
Thomas Watt Gregory (1861–1933), United States Attorney General